The Dassault Mystère/Falcon 10 is an early corporate jet aircraft developed by French aircraft manufacturer Dassault Aviation. Despite its numbering sequence it was actually developed after the Falcon 20, and although it is sometimes considered as a scaled-down version of that aircraft, it was totally redesigned with a non-circular fuselage, a new wing with slotted flaps, a split passenger door and many simplified circuits compared to the Falcon 20.

Production began in 1971 and ceased in 1989, but it remains a popular business jet on the second hand market.

By 2018, Falcon 10s from the 1970s were priced at $300,000 to $600,000.

Variants
Minifalcon  This was the original name of the Dassault Falcon 10.
  Executive transport aircraft.
Falcon 10MER  Seven aircraft used by the French Navy as instrument trainers, VIP transports, and communications and liaison aircraft. MER stood for ‘Marine Entraînement Radar – Navy Radar Training’.
Falcon 100 Designed to replace the Falcon 10, the Series 100 had an increased takeoff weight, larger luggage compartment, and glass cockpit.

Operators

Civil operators

 Air Nunavut

 Government of Croatia – Former operator.

Military operators

 French Navy - received seven Falcon 10 MER aircraft, of which six remain operational with Escadrille 57S as instrument trainers, VIP transports and liaison aircraft as of December 2020.

Specifications

See also

References

 Details on Airliners.net

External links

Falcon 0010
1970s French business aircraft
1970s French military transport aircraft
Low-wing aircraft
Twinjets
Cruciform tail aircraft
Aircraft first flown in 1970